Little Big Top is 2006 American comedy film written and directed by Ward Roberts and starring Sid Haig, Richard Riehle, Hollis Resnik, Mel England, and Jacob Zachar.  The film tells the story of an aging, unemployed clown who returns to his small hometown, content to spend the rest of his days in a drunken stupor. But his passion for clowning is reawakened by the local amateur circus.

The film went into production in July 2005 and was filmed in Peru, Indiana, which was once the winter headquarters for several famous circuses, including Ringling Brothers, Barnum and Bailey, and Wallace.  Annually during the third weekend of July, the Peru Amateur Circus holds performances for the whole week, ending with a Circus City Festival and Parade. Little Big Top premiered on October 21, 2006 at the 8th Heartland Film Festival held in Indianapolis. It was released on DVD in November 2008 by Morningstar Entertainment.

Reception
Joe Leydon of Variety wrote that the film was "a lightly likable trifle that benefits greatly from the offbeat casting of vet heavy Sid Haig" and even though it "predictably evolves into a seriocomic tale of personal redemption through clowning around", "Haig maintains just enough irascibility to keep things interesting".

References

External links 
 
 
 
 Little Big Top on FlyHighFilms.com

2006 films
American comedy films
Films set in Indiana
Films shot in Indiana
Circus films
2000s English-language films
2000s American films